This page lists the World Best Year Performances in the year 1990 in the hammer throw for both men and women. One of the main events during this season were the 1990 European Athletics Championships in Split, SFR Yugoslavia, where the final of the men's competition was held on August 31, 1990.

Men

Records

1990 World Year Ranking

Women

1990 World Year Ranking

References
digilander.libero
apulanta
hammerthrow.wz

1990
Hammer Throw Year Ranking, 1990